Edgewood, also known as Massie House and Boulder Springs, is a historic home and farm located at 591 Puppy Creek Road near Amherst, Amherst County, Virginia. It was built by Joseph Hardin Massie between 1858 and 1869.  It is a two-story, "T"-shaped plan, brick house, with a copper-clad gable roof in the Greek Revival style.  The house was altered between 1900 and 1927.  Also on the property are the contributing bank barn, a 19th-century corn crib,
c. 1920 cattle corral, a 19th-century log house, a family cemetery and the ruins of outbuildings and
secondary dwellings.

On March 14, 2008, it was added to the National Register of Historic Places.

See also
 List of Registered Historic Places in Virginia, Counties A-B (Amherst County)
 Edgewood, 1818 (Amherst, Virginia), 138 Garland Avenue, also listed on the National Register

References

Houses in Amherst County, Virginia
Houses completed in 1869
Greek Revival houses in Virginia
Houses on the National Register of Historic Places in Virginia
Farms on the National Register of Historic Places in Virginia
National Register of Historic Places in Amherst County, Virginia
1869 establishments in Virginia